Tournay is a railway station in Tournay, Occitanie, France. The station is on the Toulouse–Bayonne railway line. The station is served by TER (local) services operated by the SNCF.

Train services
The following services currently call at Tournay:
local service (TER Occitanie) Toulouse–Saint-Gaudens–Tarbes–Pau

References

Railway stations in France opened in 1867
Railway stations in Hautes-Pyrénées